Pniówek  is a village in the administrative district of Gmina Pawłowice, within Pszczyna County, Silesian Voivodeship, in southern Poland.

The village has a population of 548. Pniówek Coal Mine is located here.

References

Villages in Pszczyna County